
Gmina Ujazd is a rural gmina (administrative district) in Tomaszów Mazowiecki County, Łódź Voivodeship, in central Poland.

Villages
Gmina Ujazd contains the villages and settlements of Aleksandrów, Bielina, Bronisławów, Buków, Ciosny, Dębniak, Helenów, Józefin, Kolonia Dębniak, Łączkowice, Lipianki, Łominy, Maksymów, Marszew, Młynek, Niewiadów, Ojrzanów, Olszowa, Osiedle Niewiadów, Przesiadłów, Sangrodz, Skrzynki, Stasiolas, Szymanów, Teklów, Tobiasze, Ujazd, Wólka Krzykowska, Wygoda, Wykno and Zaosie.

Neighbouring gminas
Gmina Ujazd is bordered by the gminas of Będków, Budziszewice, Koluszki, Lubochnia, Rokiciny, Tomaszów Mazowiecki and Wolbórz.

References
 Polish official population figures 2006

Ujazd
Tomaszów Mazowiecki County